Discovery Kids (stylized as DK) is a Latin American subscription television channel owned by Warner Bros. Discovery and headquartered in Miami, Florida, which started as a programming block on the Latin American version of Discovery Channel. It launched on 1 November 1996, with programming aimed for older children and preschoolers. It was owned by Discovery Networks Latin America and remains airing alongside Discovery Kids India. The entire programming is in either Spanish or Portuguese, depending on the region.

The channel is divided into six live feeds: Pan-regional, Colombia, Southern (plus a Chilean subfeed), Mexico and Brazil, each with their own HD simulcast feeds. Until 2019, the channel had an HD version of the channel with different schedules broadcasting to all of Latin America. The network is also available in the Caribbean and Puerto Rico, alongside several islands in the Americas, such as Barbados, Grenada, and Jamaica. Discovery Kids is a 24/7 children's channel, with no nighttime block in between.

The channel was known in the mid-2000s to 2010s for its mascots, most notably, Doki and Mundi, which received merchandise and music videos, alongside a CD named Cantemos con Doki. The channel was also known in the mid-2010s to 2020s for airing Peppa Pig, becoming a major trend in Latin America. In 2003, analytics reveal that the channel's audience was 56% female and 44%, male. Adult females aged between 25 and 49 years are also part of the audience, representing a total of 49%, as they are commonly the parents of the channel's main demographic.

History

The Beginning era (1996–2002) 

On 1 November 1996, the channel launched and programming was aimed for older children and preschoolers. Preschool programming aired in the mornings, while shows for older children aired in the afternoons-evenings. The channel was originally named Discovery Kids Channel, but was shortened to simply Discovery Kids in official promos and bumpers. Its slogan was "Discovery Kids is not an infants channel, it's a kids channel!". The logo originally showed a white stick figure jumping on a red background.

In 1998, Discovery Kids changed its name, with the word "channel" getting dropped. The logo got updated, now being a planet with a ring underneath it. Its new slogan "Baterías incluidas" made its debut.

The Rainbow era (2002–2005) 

In March, 2002, preschool programming began airing around the clock on weekdays, while shows for older children only aired around the clock on weekends. The channel's current slogan "¡Aquí, en Discovery Kids!" also made its debut.

In January, 2003, the channel changed its programming to target preschoolers, removing all shows for older children, which furthermore, changed its demographic to children under 8 years of age.

In the early-to-mid 2000s, a website for the channel was launched, titled Tu Discovery Kids.

The Preschool era (2005–2009) 
In February, 2005, Doki, the channel's mascot, was introduced, originally appearing in promos. Several prototypes of the mascot were made on October 28, 2004. His name is an abbreviation of the English term "A Dog for Kids". It wasn't until March 2005 that the channel itself rebranded, which furthermore, also turned Doki into a standalone mascot. In 2006, the Doki Descubre shorts began airing on the channel, airing until the year 2010.

In 2008, a new mascot was introduced, named Mundi. Originally made to celebrate Earth Day, it later became one of the standalone mascots for the channel.

The Park era (2009–2013) 

In 2009, the channel received a new look. The logo now depicts a green K with a yellow D enclosed in a blue sphere, alongside a yellow ring in the K. The channel also created specials based on several themes, such as ambience, reading, and sports. The programming was also changed to focus on shows for children with up to 10 years of age. Newer mascots also made their first appearance: Oto, Fico, Anabella, and Gabi. The change originally appeared in Mexico, Argentina, and Chile on March 30, before expanding to other regions on May 30, and eventually expanded to Discovery Familia in the year 2010.

In December, 2009, a TV series based on its mascots, named Las Aventuras de Doki, premiered, being produced by Nelvana in collaboration with Discovery Kids. The series only lasted two episodes, before getting cancelled.

In 2010, the final Doki Descubre short aired on the channel.

The World era (2013–2016) 

In April 2013, another TV series based on its mascots, simply titled Doki, premiered, being produced by Portfolio Entertainment. The channel got rebranded as well, with the logo now being in 3D, rather than flat 2D. A high-definition feed also launched, with the D in the logo being replaced with the initials HD.

In September, 2014, the entire channel started airing entirely in 16:9. Back then, the channel mostly aired in 4:3, with some 16:9 programs airing since the rise of HD TVs.

On 5 October 2015, Pac-Man and the Ghostly Adventures premiered on this channel, which was also the first program for older children to be premiered after January 2003, originally carrying a TV-Y7 rating in the United States. It was also the only TV show on the channel to be based on an arcade game. This era lasted until 1 April 2016 for every country in Latin America except Honduras, where it lasted until May 2017.

The New era (2016–2021) 

On 1 April 2016, programming for older children returned after a 13-year hiatus for afternoons and evenings while preschool programming continues airing in the mornings. In Honduras, this era did not begin until May 2017, where a few shows aired prior to this "epoca" were delayed until this date. The logo was updated as well, replacing the "D" sphere with a speech bubble and removing the ring around the K. Doki characters were also removed from the bumpers, though its TV series is still airing until December 2019.

Many viewers began to notice an overexposure of the British TV program Peppa Pig during this era, where Discovery Kids began to create multiple marathons and long-term material for this program, causing many TV series, such as Doki, to cease airing. This also contributed to its so-called "decadencia" (Spanish word for "downfall"), as many viewers abandoned the TV channel following the situation.

On 2 January 2017, Angry Birds Toons premiered, making it the only TV show on the channel to be based on a mobile game.

In December 2019, TV shows from the channel's older eras, such as Doki and The Backyardigans, stopped airing.

Current era (2021–present) 
On 7 April 2021, the channel received a new logo, designed by Spanish design agency Dtmg.tv Studio, with the "D" speech bubble being changed back to a sphere, and the K becoming more lowercase. Children also appear in promos.

Programming

Website 
Discovery Kids has a website that launched in the early-to-mid 2000s, with the app launching in the early-to-mid 2010s. A Brazilian version was also made, with all of its content being translated into Portuguese.

One common feature of the site are its online games, which originally required the Flash Player plugin.

The site offers games and formerly interactive books, and activities. At launch, the website was titled Tu Discovery Kids, with the app being simply titled Discovery Kids at launch.

In March 2005, the website received a major update. New games based on the channel's mascot were made, such as Saltando con Doki.

In 2008, the website received another major update. A video player was added to its home page, alongside a Flash-based interface and the addition of minigames. Accounts were also implemented.

In 2011, the website received yet another major update, now featuring a 3D logo casting shadows in the banner. During this era, the app launched.

Between February 2012 and 2018, a webpage appeared on the website, title Kids en Control. Kids en Control allows children to vote for shows, similar to Cartoon Network's 'Votatoon' which was exclusive to Latin America. The show that have the most votes would air via marathons on Saturdays.

In April 2013, the website received a minor update. The background has been changed to the one from the new look at the time. The background has three variants depending on the hour set in the user's computer: day, noon, and night.

In July 2015, the website and app got rebranded as Discovery Kids Play, featuring the addition of protected content that could only be accessed via an account, as well as HTML5-based games. Web browsers with Flash Player support are still able to play the old site's Flash games. The tudiscoverykids.com domain remained in use until late 2016, when it was changed to discoverykidsplay.com, originally used as a redirect following the launch of Discovery Kids Play.

In December 2019, the website and app was renamed to Discovery Kids Plus, with a new design. The new website is also geo-blocked, being exclusive to Latin America. All of the Flash games from the old sites were also removed due to Adobe Flash Player's end-of-life. The Brazilian website was also updated to redirect to the Spanish website once accessed outside of Brazil.

In November 2022, tudiscoverykids.com and Discovery Kids Play now downloads a file with no format that once open in Notepad, read "all is well". On December 12, 2022, the site rebranded to simply Discovery Kids and removed all of its videos and episodes.

Audience composition 
According to TGI Latina in 2003, most of the audience who received the channel were female, which represents a total of 56%, with the male audience at 44%. Adult female aged between 25 and 49 years were also involved, as they are commonly the parents of children who guide at watching the channel, representing a total of 49%.

Legacy 
In 2021, fake VHS recordings from the channel became a minor trend in Latin America. On 31 October 2021, a project meant to revive the 2008-2011 website was announced, named Retro Kids, created by IanRandomer and co-created by Shimi Doki and his team. Although initially cancelled, it was revived on 21 November 2021. The app was based on Ungoogled Chromium, which itself, is based on the open-source Chromium web browser. On 9 December 2021, the website was updated to use WordPress. Before development on Retro Kids started, IanRandomer and Shimi Doki were known for finding and archiving lost media based on the Australian show Hi-5 and the channel's primary mascots.

Feeds 

The channel is broadcast in 3 different feeds, plus one subfeed. Each feed also has its own HD simulcast feed since 2013.

Pan-regional feed: broadcasting to most Latin American countries, including the Caribbean. It uses the Colombian (UTC-5) and Argentine (UTC-3) time zones. And Peru.
Mexican feed: broadcasting exclusively to that country, with different schedule and TV series. It uses the Mexico City time zone (UTC-6/UTC−5 DST).
Chilean subfeed: available in Chile with local advertisement. During winter time, it delays programming by one hour to match the country's time zone (turning itself into a +1 timeshift feed). It uses the Santiago time zone (UTC-4/UTC-3 DST). It is also an NTSC subfeed, as the original southern feed originally broadcast in the PAL-N television standard.
Brazilian feed: broadcasting exclusively to that country, with different schedule and TV series. Broadcasting in Portuguese, it uses the Brasilia time zone (UTC-3).

Live events 
 La Ronda de Discovery Kids: The channel organized live events, named La Ronda de Discovery Kids, where Doki, the channel's mascot, along with characters from the series visited some cities and made performances, originally made to celebrate the channel's 10th anniversary in 2006. The last event with that name was in 2008. The channel still organizes events on Latin American cities from time to time. In 2009, a similar project, named Exploración, which dealt with the environment, was made. In 2010, a similar event, named En sus marcas, listos, ya, was made in Mexico. In July, August, and September 2012, a new event, named Expreso Discovery Kids, was made in city of Mexico and Venezuela.

See also 
 Cartoon Network (Latin American TV channel)
 Cartoonito (Latin American TV channel)
 Discovery Familia
 Discovery Kids (Australia)
 Discovery Kids (Canada)
 Discovery Kids (UK)
 Discovery Kids (India)

Notes

References

External links 

 Discovery Kids

Children's television networks
Latin American cable television networks
Television channels and stations established in 1996
Spanish-language television stations
Warner Bros. Discovery networks
Television channel articles with incorrect naming style
Preschool education television networks
Warner Bros. Discovery Americas